Len Peak Oval is a multi-sports venue in Coolangatta, a suburb in the Gold Coast, Australia. It includes an Australian rules football ground and has the unique distinction of being located less than 50 metres from the Queensland-New South Wales border.

It has been used by the Coolangatta Tweed Blues men's and women's teams as their home game base.

The Oval is named after former Gold Coast Mayor Alderman Len Peak.

See also

 Sports on the Gold Coast, Queensland

References

Australian rules football grounds
Sports venues on the Gold Coast, Queensland